Francisco González Gómez (Santander, 1918 – 7 March 1990) was a Spanish caricaturist, painter and sculptor, considered in his time as having re-invented caricature in Spain.

Notes 

1918 births
1990 deaths
People from Santander, Spain
Artists from Cantabria
Spanish caricaturists